CyberLink Corp. is a Taiwanese multimedia software company headquartered in New Taipei City, Taiwan. Its products include PC and mobile applications for playback of movies and media, editing of videos and photos, and disc burning and backup solutions.

The company has regional offices in the United States, Netherlands, and Japan.

History
Founded in 1996, CyberLink Corp. creates multimedia software and AI facial recognition technology. The company developed and owns over 200 patented technologies.

CyberLink's headquarters and research facilities are located in Taipei, Republic of China (Taiwan). Regional offices cover operations in North America, Japan, Europe, and Asia-Pacific.

Products

Media creation 

PowerDirector – Video editing software, was first released in 2001
 PhotoDirector – Photo editing software
 AudioDirector – Audio editing software, audio restoration and repair
 ColorDirector – Color grading software
 Director Suite – CyberLink first released its Director Suite of creative software in 2011. It includes PowerDirector, PhotoDirector, AudioDirector and ColorDirector in a single package.
 CyberLink Media Suite – A multimedia software package including media player PowerDVD, video editing software PowerDirector, photo editing software PhotoDirector, disc burning utility Power2Go, and media conversion utility MediaEspresso
 ActionDirector – Video editing software designed for quick editing of footage taken with action cameras
 MakeupDirector – Digital makeup software to enhance makeup design for makeup artists, portrait photographers and beauty enthusiasts

Media entertainment 

PowerDVD – A universal media player for movie discs, video files, photos and music. In 2016, PowerDVD achieved certification from the Blu-ray Disc Association (BDA) for the playback of Ultra HD Blu-ray Discs, and became the first software player to pass the BD-ROM 4.0 PC Application Software License process.
 MediaShow – Image organiser and viewer
 MediaEspresso – Converts videos, photos and music to a wide range of formats for playback on popular media players and mobile devices

Web camera apps 

 YouCam – Webcam and camera app
 PerfectCam – AR makeup app for PC webcam

Disc burning and authoring 

 Power2Go – Disc burning and optical disc authoring software
 PowerProducer – DVD authoring software

Business communication 

 U Messenger – Instant Messenger
 U Meeting – Video conferencing and meeting
 U Webinar – Remote presentation and webinar

Facial recognition and AI 

 FaceMe – Facial recognition engine
Ranked one of the best in the NIST Face Recognition Vendor Test (VISA and WILD tests) with up to 99.7% accuracy rate.

Mobile apps 
CyberLink released its first mobile app, MediaStory, in 2010. Since then, the company has introduced another 14 apps on Android, iOS and Windows mobile platforms, including PhotoDirector and PowerDirector. CyberLink spun off its beauty products to a sister company named Perfect Corp. in June 2015.

 PowerDirector
 PhotoDirector
 ActionDirector
 YouCam Snap
 Power Media Player
 PowerDVD Remote
 YouNote
 AudioClipper
 ImageChef

See also
 List of companies of Taiwan

References

External links
 
DirectorZone site
FaceMe

Taiwanese companies established in 1996
Companies based in New Taipei
Software companies established in 1996
Software companies of Taiwan
Taiwanese brands
Companies listed on the Taiwan Stock Exchange
2004 initial public offerings